Shaivism is one of the major Hindu traditions, which worships Shiva as the Supreme Being. One of the largest Hindu denominations, it incorporates many sub-traditions ranging from devotional dualistic theism such as Shaiva Siddhanta to yoga-orientated monistic non-theism such as Kashmiri Shaivism. It considers both the Vedas and the Agama texts as important sources of theology.

Shaivism developed as an amalgam of pre-Vedic religions and traditions derived from the southern Tamil Shaiva Siddhanta traditions and philosophies, which were assimilated in the non-Vedic Shiva-tradition. In the process of Sanskritisation and the formation of Hinduism, starting in the last centuries BCE, these pre-Vedic traditions became aligned with the Vedic deity Rudra and other Vedic deities, incorporating the non-Vedic Shiva-traditions into the Vedic-Brahmanical fold.

Both devotional and monistic Shaivism became popular in the 1st millennium CE, rapidly becoming the dominant religious tradition of many Hindu kingdoms. It arrived in Southeast Asia shortly thereafter, leading to the construction of thousands of Shaiva temples on the islands of Indonesia as well as Cambodia and Vietnam, co-evolving with Buddhism in these regions.

Shaivite theology ranges from Shiva being the creator, preserver, and destroyer to being the same as the Atman (Self) within oneself and every living being. It is closely related to Shaktism, and some Shaivas worship in both Shiva and Shakti temples. It is the Hindu tradition that most accepts ascetic life and emphasizes yoga, and like other Hindu traditions encourages an individual to discover and be one with Shiva within. The followers of Shaivism are called "Shaivites" or "Saivas".

Etymology and nomenclature
Shiva literally means kind, friendly, gracious, or auspicious. As a proper name, it means "The Auspicious One".

The word Shiva is used as an adjective in the Rig Veda, as an epithet for several Rigvedic deities, including Rudra. The term Shiva also connotes "liberation, final emancipation" and "the auspicious one", this adjective sense of usage is addressed to many deities in Vedic layers of literature. The term evolved from the Vedic Rudra-Shiva to the noun Shiva in the Epics and the Puranas, as an auspicious deity who is the "creator, reproducer and dissolver".

The Sanskrit word  or  means "relating to the god Shiva", while the related beliefs, practices, history, literature and sub-traditions constitute Shaivism.

Overview
The reverence for Shiva is one of the pan-Hindu traditions found widely across India predominantly in Southern India, Sri Lanka, and Nepal. While Shiva is revered broadly, Hinduism itself is a complex religion and a way of life, with a diversity of ideas on spirituality and traditions. It has no ecclesiastical order, no unquestionable religious authorities, no governing body, no prophet(s) nor any binding holy book; Hindus can choose to be polytheistic, pantheistic, monotheistic, monistic, agnostic, atheistic, or humanist.

Shaivism is a major tradition within Hinduism with a theology that is predominantly related to the Hindu god Shiva. Shaivism has many different sub-traditions with regional variations and differences in philosophy. Shaivism has a vast literature with different philosophical schools ranging from nondualism, dualism, and mixed schools.

Origins and history

The origins of Shaivism are unclear and a matter of debate among scholars, as it is an amalgam of pre-Vedic cults and traditions and Vedic culture.

Indus Valley Civilisation

Some trace the origins to the Indus Valley civilization, which reached its peak around 2500–2000 BCE. Archeological discoveries show seals that suggest a deity that somewhat appears like Shiva. Of these is the Pashupati seal, which early scholars interpreted as someone seated in a meditating yoga pose surrounded by animals, and with horns. This "Pashupati" (Lord of Animals, Sanskrit ) seal has been interpreted by these scholars as a prototype of Shiva. Gavin Flood characterizes these views as "speculative", saying that it is not clear from the seal if the figure has three faces, or is seated in a yoga posture, or even that the shape is intended to represent a human figure.

Other scholars state that the Indus Valley script remains undeciphered, and the interpretation of the Pashupati seal is uncertain. According to Srinivasan, the proposal that it is proto-Shiva may be a case of projecting "later practices into archeological findings". Similarly, Asko Parpola states that other archaeological finds such as the early Elamite seals dated to 3000–2750 BCE show similar figures and these have been interpreted as "seated bull" and not a yogi, and the bull interpretation is likely more accurate.

Vedic elements
The Rigveda (~1500–1200 BCE) has the earliest clear mention of Rudra in its hymns 2.33, 1.43 and 1.114. The text also includes a Satarudriya, an influential hymn with embedded hundred epithets for Rudra, that is cited in many medieval era Shaiva texts as well as recited in major Shiva temples of Hindus in contemporary times. Yet, the Vedic literature only present scriptural theology, but does not attest to the existence of Shaivism.

The Shvetashvatara Upanishad, likely composed before the Bhagavad Gita about 4th century BCE contains the theistic foundations of Shaivism wrapped in a monistic structure. It contains the key terms and ideas of Shaivism, such as Shiva, Rudra, Maheswara, Guru, Bhakti, Yoga, Atman, Brahman and self-knowledge.

Emergence of Shaivism 

According to Gavin Flood, "the formation of Śaiva traditions as we understand them begins to occur during the period from 200 BC to 100 AD." Shiva was originally probably not a Brahmanical god, but eventually came to be incorporated into the Brahmanical fold. The pre-Vedic Shiva acquired a growing prominence as its cult assimilated numerous "ruder faiths" and their mythologies, and the Epics and Puranas preserve pre-Vedic myths and legends of these traditions assimilated by the Shiva-cult. Shiva's growing prominence was facilitated by identification with a number of Vedic deities, such as Purusha, Rudra, Agni, Indra, among others. The followers of Shiva were gradually accepted into the Brahmanical fold, becoming allowed to recite some of the Vedic hymns.

Patanjali's , dated to the 2nd century BCE, mentions the term Shiva-bhagavata in section 5.2.76. Patanjali, while explaining Panini's rules of grammar, states that this term refers to a devotee clad in animal skins and carrying an ayah sulikah (iron spear, trident lance) as an icon representing his god. The Shvetashvatara Upanishad (late 1st mill. BCE) mentions terms such as Rudra, Shiva, and Maheshwaram, but its interpretation as a theistic or monistic text of Shaivism is disputed. In the early centuries of the common era is the first clear evidence of Pāśupata Shaivism.

The Mahabharata mentions Shaiva ascetics, such as in chapters 4.13 and 13.140. Other evidence that is possibly linked to the importance of Shaivism in ancient times are in epigraphy and numismatics, such as in the form of prominent Shiva-like reliefs on Kushan Empire era gold coins. However, this is controversial, as an alternate hypothesis for these reliefs is based on Zoroastrian Oesho. According to Flood, coins dated to the ancient Greek, Saka and Parthian kings who ruled parts of the Indian subcontinent after the arrival of Alexander the Great also show Shiva iconography, but this evidence is weak and subject to competing inferences.

The inscriptions found in the Himalayan region, such as those in the Kathmandu valley of Nepal suggest that Shaivism (particularly Pashupata monism) was established in this region during the Mauryas and the Guptas reign of the Indian subcontinent, by the 5th century. These inscriptions have been dated by modern techniques to between 466 and 645 CE.

Puranic Shaivism
During the Gupta Empire (c. 320–500 CE) the genre of Purana literature developed in India, and many of these Puranas contain extensive chapters on Shaivism – along with Vaishnavism, Shaktism, Smarta Traditions of Brahmins and other topics – suggesting the importance of Shaivism by then. The most important Shaiva Puranas of this period include the Shiva Purana and the Linga Purana.

Post-Gupta development

Most of the Gupta kings, beginning with Chandragupta II (Vikramaditya) (375–413 CE) were known as Parama Bhagavatas or Bhagavata Vaishnavas and had been ardent promoters of Vaishnavism. But following the Huna invasions, especially those of the Alchon Huns circa 500 CE, the Gupta Empire declined and fragmented, ultimately collapsing completely, with the effect of discrediting Vaishnavism, the religion it had been so ardently promoting. The newly arising regional powers in central and northern India, such as the Aulikaras, the Maukharis, the Maitrakas, the Kalacuris or the Vardhanas preferred adopting Shaivism instead, giving a strong impetus to the development of the worship of Shiva. Vaisnavism remained strong mainly in the territories which had not been affected by these events: South India and Kashmir.

In the early 7th century, the Chinese Buddhist pilgrim Xuanzang (Huen Tsang) visited India and wrote a memoir in Chinese that mentions the prevalence of Shiva temples all over North Indian subcontinent, including in the Hindu Kush region such as Nuristan. Between the 5th and 11th century CE, major Shaiva temples had been built in central, southern and eastern regions of the subcontinent, including those at Badami cave temples, Aihole, Elephanta Caves, Ellora Caves (Kailasha, cave 16), Khajuraho, Bhuvaneshwara, Chidambaram, Madurai, and Conjeevaram.

Major scholars of competing Hindu traditions from the second half of the 1st millennium CE, such as Adi Shankara of Advaita Vedanta and Ramanuja of Vaishnavism, mention several Shaiva sects, particularly the four groups: Pashupata, Lakulisha, tantric Shaiva and Kapalika. The description is conflicting, with some texts stating the tantric, puranik and Vedic traditions of Shaivism to be hostile to each other while others suggest them to be amicable sub-traditions. Some texts state that Kapalikas reject the Vedas and are involved in extreme experimentation, while others state the Shaiva sub-traditions revere the Vedas but are non-Puranik.

South India
Shaivism was the predominant tradition in South India, co-existing with Buddhism and Jainism, before the Vaishnava Alvars launched the Bhakti movement in the 7th century, and influential Vedanta scholars such as Ramanuja developed a philosophical and organizational framework that helped Vaishnava expand. Though both traditions of Hinduism have ancient roots, given their mention in the epics such as the Mahabharata, Shaivism flourished in South India much earlier.

The Mantramarga of Shaivism, according to Alexis Sanderson, provided a template for the later though independent and highly influential Pancaratrika treatises of Vaishnava. This is evidenced in Hindu texts such as the Isvarasamhita, Padmasamhita and Paramesvarasamhita.

Along with the Himalayan region stretching from Kashmir through Nepal, the Shaiva tradition in South India has been one of the largest sources of preserved Shaivism-related manuscripts from ancient and medieval India. The region was also the source of Hindu arts, temple architecture, and merchants who helped spread Shaivism into southeast Asia in early 1st millennium CE.

There are tens of thousands of Hindu temples where Shiva is either the primary deity or reverentially included in anthropomorphic or aniconic form (lingam, or svayambhu). Numerous historic Shaiva temples have survived in Tamil Nadu, Kerala, parts of Andhra Pradesh and Karnataka. Certain regions have a greater density of Shiva temples, such as in the Thanjavur region of Tamil Nadu, where numerous Shaiva temples were built during the Chola empire era, between 800 and 1200 CE. Gudimallam is the oldest known lingam and has been dated to between 3rd to 1st-century BCE. It is a carved five feet high stone lingam with an anthropomorphic image of Shiva on one side. This ancient lingam is in Chittoor district of Andhra Pradesh.

Southeast Asia

Shaivism arrived in a major way in southeast Asia from south India, and to much lesser extent into China and Tibet from the Himalayan region. It co-developed with Buddhism in this region, in many cases. For example, in the Caves of the Thousand Buddhas, a few caves include Shaivism ideas. The epigraphical and cave arts evidence suggest that Shaiva Mahesvara and Mahayana Buddhism had arrived in Indo-China region in the Funan period, that is in the first half of the 1st millennium CE. In Indonesia, temples at archaeological sites and numerous inscription evidence dated to the early period (400 to 700 CE), suggest that Shiva was the highest god. This co-existence of Shaivism and Buddhism in Java continued through about 1500 CE when both Hinduism and Buddhism were replaced with Islam, and persists today in the province of Bali.

The Shaivist and Buddhist traditions overlapped significantly in southeast Asia, particularly in Indonesia, Cambodia, and Vietnam between the 5th and the 15th century. Shaivism and Shiva held the paramount position in ancient Java, Sumatra, Bali, and neighboring islands, though the sub-tradition that developed creatively integrated more ancient beliefs that pre-existed. In the centuries that followed, the merchants and monks who arrived in Southeast Asia, brought Shaivism, Vaishnavism and Buddhism, and these developed into a syncretic, mutually supporting form of traditions.

Indonesia
In Balinese Hinduism, Dutch ethnographers further subdivided Siwa (shaivaites) Sampradaya" into five – Kemenuh, Keniten, Mas, Manuba and Petapan. This classification was to accommodate the observed marriage between higher caste Brahmana men with lower caste women.

Beliefs and practices
Shaivism centers around Shiva, but it has many sub-traditions whose theological beliefs and practices vary significantly. They range from dualistic devotional theism to monistic meditative discovery of Shiva within oneself. Within each of these theologies, there are two sub-groups. One sub-group is called Vedic-Puranic, who use the terms such as "Shiva, Mahadeva, Maheshvara and others" synonymously, and they use iconography such as the Linga, Nandi, Trishula (trident), as well as anthropomorphic statues of Shiva in temples to help focus their practices. Another sub-group is called esoteric, which fuses it with abstract Sivata (feminine energy) or Sivatva (neuter abstraction), wherein the theology integrates the goddess (Shakti) and the god (Shiva) with Tantra practices and Agama teachings. There is a considerable overlap between these Shaivas and the Shakta Hindus.

Vedic, Puranik, and esoteric Shaivism
Scholars such as Alexis Sanderson discuss Shaivism in three categories: Vedic, Puranik and non-Puranik (esoteric, tantric). They place Vedic and Puranik together given the significant overlap, while placing Non-Puranik esoteric sub-traditions as a separate category.

 Vedic-Puranik. The majority within Shaivism follow the Vedic-Puranik traditions. They revere the Vedas, the Puranas and have beliefs that span dualistic theism style Shiva Bhakti (devotionalism) to monistic non-theism dedicated to yoga and meditative lifestyle sometimes with renouncing householder life for monastic pursuits of spirituality. The Yoga practice is particularly pronounced in nondualistic Shaivism, with the practice refined into a methodology such as four-fold upaya: being pathless (anupaya, iccha-less, desire-less), being divine (sambhavopaya, jnana, knowledge-full), being energy (saktopaya, kriya, action-full) and being individual (anavopaya).
 Non-Puranik. These are esoteric, minority sub-traditions wherein devotees are initiated into a specific cult they prefer. Their goals vary, ranging from liberation in current life (mukti) to seeking pleasures in higher worlds (bhukti). Their means also vary, ranging from meditative atimarga or "outer higher path" versus those whose means are recitation-driven mantras. The atimarga sub-traditions include Pashupatas and Lakula. According to Sanderson, the Pashupatas have the oldest heritage, likely from the 2nd century CE, as evidenced by ancient Hindu texts such as the Shanti Parva book of the Mahabharata epic. The tantric sub-tradition in this category is traceable to post-8th to post-11th century depending on the region of Indian subcontinent, paralleling the development of Buddhist and Jain tantra traditions in this period. Among these are the dualistic Shaiva Siddhanta and Bhairava Shaivas (non-Saiddhantika), based on whether they recognize any value in Vedic orthopraxy. These sub-traditions cherish secrecy, special symbolic formulae, initiation by a teacher and the pursuit of siddhi (special powers). Some of these traditions also incorporate theistic ideas, elaborate geometric yantra with embedded spiritual meaning, mantras and rituals.

Shaivism versus other Hindu traditions

Shaivism sub-traditions subscribe to various philosophies, are similar in some aspects and differ in others. These traditions compare with Vaishnavism, Shaktism and Smartism as follows:

Texts
{{Quote box
 |quote  = Shaiva manuscripts that have survived(post-8th century)
Nepal and Himalayan region = 140,000
South India = 8,600
Others (Devanagiri) = 2,000
Bali and SE Asia = Many
 |source = —Alexis Sanderson, The Saiva Literature<ref name=sanderson2014p1>Alexis Sanderson (2014), 'The Saiva Literature, Journal of Indological Studies, Kyoto, Nos. 24 & 25, pages 1–113</ref>
 |bgcolor=#FFE0BB
 |align  = right
}}
Over its history, Shaivism has been nurtured by numerous texts ranging from scriptures to theological treatises. These include the Vedas and Upanishads, the Agamas, and the Bhasya. According to Gavin Flood – a professor at Oxford University specializing in Shaivism and phenomenology, Shaiva scholars developed a sophisticated theology, in its diverse traditions. Among the notable and influential commentaries by dvaita (dualistic) theistic Shaivism scholars were the 8th century Sadyajoti, the 10th century Ramakantha, 11th century Bhojadeva. The dualistic theology was challenged by the numerous scholars of advaita (nondualistic, monistic) Shaivism persuasion such as the 8th/9th century Vasugupta, the 10th century Abhinavagupta and 11th century Kshemaraja, particularly the scholars of the Pratyabhijna, Spanda and Kashmiri Shaivism schools of theologians.

Vedas and Principal Upanishads
The Vedas and Upanishads are shared scriptures of Hinduism, while the Agamas are sacred texts of specific sub-traditions. The surviving Vedic literature can be traced to the 1st millennium BCE and earlier, while the surviving Agamas can be traced to 1st millennium of the common era. The Vedic literature, in Shaivism, is primary and general, while Agamas are special treatise. In terms of philosophy and spiritual precepts, no Agama that goes against the Vedic literature, states Mariasusai Dhavamony, will be acceptable to the Shaivas. According to David Smith, "a key feature of the Tamil Saiva Siddhanta, one might almost say its defining feature, is the claim that its source lies in the Vedas as well as the Agamas, in what it calls the Vedagamas". This school's view can be summed as,

The  Upanishad (400–200 BCE) is the earliest textual exposition of a systematic philosophy of Shaivism.

Shaiva minor Upanishads
Shaivism-inspired scholars authored 14 Shiva-focussed Upanishads that are called the Shaiva Upanishads. These are considered part of 95 minor Upanishads in the Muktikā Upanishadic corpus of Hindu literature.Peter Heehs (2002), Indian Religions, New York University Press, pages 60–88 The earliest among these were likely composed in 1st millennium BCE, while the last ones in the late medieval era.

The Shaiva Upanishads present diverse ideas, ranging from bhakti-style theistic dualism themes to a synthesis of Shaiva ideas with Advaitic (nondualism), Yoga, Vaishnava and Shakti themes.

Shaiva Agamas
The Agama texts of Shaivism are another important foundation of Shaivism theology. These texts include Shaiva cosmology, epistemology, philosophical doctrines, precepts on meditation and practices, four kinds of yoga, mantras, meanings and manuals for Shaiva temples, and other elements of practice.Mariasusai Dhavamony (2002), Hindu-Christian Dialogue, Rodopi, pages 54–56 These canonical texts exist in Sanskrit and in south Indian languages such as Tamil.

The Agamas present a diverse range of philosophies, ranging from theistic dualism to absolute monism.Richard Davis (2014), Ritual in an Oscillating Universe: Worshipping Siva in Medieval India, Princeton University Press, page 167 note 21, Quote (page 13): "Some agamas argue a monist metaphysics, while others are decidedly dualist. Some claim ritual is the most efficacious means of religious attainment, while others assert that knowledge is more important." In Shaivism, there are ten dualistic (dvaita) Agama texts, eighteen qualified monism-cum-dualism (bhedabheda) Agama texts and sixty four monism (advaita) Agama texts. The Bhairava Shastras are monistic, while Shiva Shastras are dualistic.JS Vasugupta (2012), Śiva Sūtras, Motilal Banarsidass, pages 252, 259

The Agama texts of Shaiva and Vaishnava schools are premised on existence of Atman (Self) and the existence of an Ultimate Reality (Brahman) which is considered identical to Shiva in Shaivism. The texts differ in the relation between the two. Some assert the dualistic philosophy of the individual Self and Ultimate Reality being different, while others state a Oneness between the two. Kashmir Shaiva Agamas posit absolute oneness, that is God (Shiva) is within man, God is within every being, God is present everywhere in the world including all non-living beings, and there is no spiritual difference between life, matter, man and God. While Agamas present diverse theology, in terms of philosophy and spiritual precepts, no Agama that goes against the Vedic literature, states Dhavamony, has been acceptable to the Shaivas.

Traditions

Shaivism is ancient, and over time it developed many sub-traditions. These broadly existed and are studied in three groups: theistic dualism, nontheistic monism, and those that combine features or practices of the two. Sanderson presents the historic classification found in Indian texts, namely Atimarga of the Shaiva monks and Mantramarga that was followed by both the renunciates (sannyasi) and householders (grihastha) in Shaivism. Sub-traditions of Shaivas did not exclusively focus on Shiva, but others such as the Devi (goddess) Shaktism.

Sannyasi Shaiva: Atimarga
The Atimarga branch of Shaivism emphasizes liberation (salvation) – or the end of all Dukkha – as the primary goal of spiritual pursuits. It was the path for Shaiva ascetics, in contrast to Shaiva householders whose path was described as Mantramarga and who sought both salvation as well as the yogi-siddhi powers and pleasures in life. The Atimarga revered the Vedic sources of Shaivism, and sometimes referred to in ancient Indian texts as Raudra (from Vedic Rudra).

Pashupata Atimargi

Pashupata: are the Shaivite sub-tradition with the oldest heritage, as evidenced by Indian texts dated to around the start of the common era. It is a monist tradition, that considers Shiva to be within oneself, in every being and everything observed. The Pashupata path to liberation is one of asceticism that is traditionally restricted to Brahmin males. Pashupata theology, according to Shiva Sutras, aims for a spiritual state of consciousness where the Pashupata yogi "abides in one's own unfettered nature", where the external rituals feel unnecessary, where every moment and every action becomes an internal vow, a spiritual ritual unto itself.

The Pashupatas derive their Sanskrit name from two words: Pashu (beast) and Pati (lord), where the chaotic and ignorant state, one imprisoned by bondage and assumptions, is conceptualized as the beast, and the Atman (Self, Shiva) that is present eternally everywhere as the Pati. The tradition aims at realizing the state of being one with Shiva within and everywhere. It has extensive literature, and a fivefold path of spiritual practice that starts with external practices, evolving into internal practices and ultimately meditative yoga, with the aim of overcoming all suffering (Dukkha) and reaching the state of bliss (Ananda).

The tradition is attributed to a sage from Gujarat named Lakulisha (~2nd century CE). He is the purported author of the Pashupata-sutra, a foundational text of this tradition. Other texts include the bhasya (commentary) on Pashupata-sutra by Kaudinya, the Gaṇakārikā, Pañchārtha bhāshyadipikā and Rāśikara-bhāshya. The Pashupatha monastic path was available to anyone of any age, but it required renunciation from four Ashrama (stage) into the fifth stage of Siddha-Ashrama. The path started as a life near a Shiva temple and silent meditation, then a stage when the ascetic left the temple and did karma exchange (be cursed by others, but never curse back). He then moved to the third stage of life where he lived like a loner in a cave or abandoned places or Himalayan mountains, and towards the end of his life he moved to a cremation ground, surviving on little, peacefully awaiting his death.

The Pashupatas have been particularly prominent in Gujarat, Rajasthan, Kashmir and Nepal. The community is found in many parts of the Indian subcontinent. In the late medieval era, Pashupatas Shaiva ascetics became extinct.For Pāśupata as an ascetic movement see: Michaels (2004), p. 62.

Lakula Atimargi
This second division of the Atimarga developed from the Pashupatas. Their fundamental text too was the Pashupata Sutras. They differed from Pashupata Atimargi in that they departed radically from the Vedic teachings, respected no Vedic or social customs. He would walk around, for example, almost naked, drank liquor in public, and used a human skull as his begging bowl for food. The Lakula Shaiva ascetic recognized no act nor words as forbidden, he freely did whatever he felt like, much like the classical depiction of his deity Rudra in ancient Hindu texts. However, according to Alexis Sanderson, the Lakula ascetic was strictly celibate and did not engage in sex.

Secondary literature, such as those written by Kashmiri Ksemaraja, suggest that the Lakula had their canons on theology, rituals and literature on pramanas (epistemology). However, their primary texts are believed to be lost, and have not survived into the modern era.

Grihastha and Sannyasi Shaiva: Mantramarga

"Mantramārga" (Sanskrit: मन्त्रमार्ग, "the path of mantras") has been the Shaiva tradition for both householders and monks. It grew from the Atimarga tradition. This tradition sought not just liberation from Dukkha (suffering, unsatisfactoriness), but special powers (siddhi) and pleasures (bhoga), both in this life and next. The siddhi were particularly the pursuit of Mantramarga monks, and it is this sub-tradition that experimented with a great diversity of rites, deities, rituals, yogic techniques and mantras. Both the Mantramarga and Atimarga are ancient traditions, more ancient than the date of their texts that have survived, according to Sanderson. Mantramārga grew to become a dominant form of Shaivism in this period. It also spread outside of India into Southeast Asia's Khmer Empire, Java, Bali and Cham.

The Mantramarga tradition created the Shaiva Agamas and Shaiva tantra (technique) texts. This literature presented new forms of ritual, yoga and mantra. This literature was highly influential not just to Shaivism, but to all traditions of Hinduism, as well as to Buddhism and Jainism. Mantramarga had both theistic and monistic themes, which co-evolved and influenced each other. The tantra texts reflect this, where the collection contains both dualistic and non-dualistic theologies. The theism in the tantra texts parallel those found in Vaishnavism and Shaktism. Shaiva Siddhanta is a major subtradition that emphasized dualism during much of its history.

Shaivism has had strong nondualistic (advaita) sub-traditions. Its central premise has been that the Atman (Self) of every being is identical to Shiva, its various practices and pursuits directed at understanding and being one with the Shiva within. This monism is close but differs somewhat from the monism found in Advaita Vedanta of Adi Shankara. Unlike Shankara's Advaita, Shaivism monist schools consider Maya as Shakti, or energy and creative primordial power that explains and propels the existential diversity.

Srikantha, influenced by Ramanuja, formulated Shaiva Vishishtadvaita. In this theology, Atman (Self) is not identical with Brahman, but shares with the Supreme all its qualities. Appayya Dikshita (1520–1592), an Advaita scholar, proposed pure monism, and his ideas influenced Shaiva in the Karnataka region. His Shaiva Advaita doctrine is inscribed on the walls of Kalakanthesvara temple in Adaiyappalam (Tiruvannamalai district).A Topographical List Of The Inscriptions Of The Madras Presindency (collected Till 1915) With Notes And References Volume I, V. Rangacharya, Madras Government Press, pages 47–48

Shaiva Siddhanta

The Śaivasiddhānta ("the established doctrine of Shiva") is the earliest sampradaya (tradition, lineage) of Tantric Shaivism, dating from the 5th century.Sanderson, Alexis; the Saiva Age, page 45. The tradition emphasizes loving devotion to Shiva, uses 5th to 9th-century Tamil hymns called Tirumurai. A key philosophical text of this sub-tradition was composed by 13th-century Meykandar. This theology presents three universal realities: the pashu (individual Self), the pati (lord, Shiva), and the pasha (Self's bondage) through ignorance, karma and maya. The tradition teaches ethical living, service to the community and through one's work, loving worship, yoga practice and discipline, continuous learning and self-knowledge as means for liberating the individual Self from bondage.

The tradition may have originated in Kashmir where it developed a sophisticated theology propagated by theologians Sadyojoti, Bhatta Nārāyanakantha and his son Bhatta Rāmakantha (c. 950–1000). However, after the arrival of Islamic rulers in north India, it thrived in the south. The philosophy of Shaiva Siddhanta, is particularly popular in south India, Sri Lanka, Malaysia and Singapore.

The historic Shaiva Siddhanta literature is an enormous body of texts. The tradition includes both Shiva and Shakti (goddess), but with a growing emphasis on metaphysical abstraction. Unlike the experimenters of Atimarga tradition and other sub-traditions of Mantramarga, states Sanderson, the Shaiva Siddhanta tradition had no ritual offering or consumption of "alcoholic drinks, blood or meat". Their practices focussed on abstract ideas of spirituality, worship and loving devotion to Shiva as SadaShiva, and taught the authority of the Vedas and Shaiva Agamas. This tradition diversified in its ideas over time, with some of its scholars integrating a non-dualistic theology.

Nayanars

By the 7th century, the Nayanars, a tradition of poet-saints in the bhakti tradition developed in ancient Tamil Nadu with a focus on Shiva, comparable to that of the Vaisnava Alvars. The devotional Tamil poems of the Nayanars are divided into eleven collections together known as Tirumurai, along with a Tamil Purana called the Periya Puranam. The first seven collections are known as the Tevaram and are regarded by Tamils as equivalent to the Vedas. They were composed in the 7th century by Sambandar, Appar, and Sundarar.

Tirumular (also spelled  or ), the author of the Tirumantiram (also spelled Tirumandiram) is considered by Tattwananda to be the earliest exponent of Shaivism in Tamil areas. Tirumular is dated as 7th or 8th century by Maurice Winternitz. The Tirumantiram is a primary source for the system of Shaiva Siddhanta, being the tenth book of its canon. The Tiruvacakam by Manikkavacagar is an important collection of hymns.

Tantra Diksha traditions
The main element of all Shaiva Tantra is the practice of diksha, a ceremonial initiation in which divinely revealed mantras are given to the initiate by a Guru.

A notable feature of some "left tantra" ascetics was their pursuit of siddhis (supernatural abilities) and bala (powers), such as averting danger (santih) and the ability to harm enemies (abhicarah). Ganachakras, ritual feasts, would sometimes be held in cemeteries and cremation grounds and featured possession by powerful female deities called Yoginis. The cult of Yoginis aimed to gain special powers through esoteric worship of the Shakti or the feminine aspects of the divine. The groups included sisterhoods that participated in the rites.

Some traditions defined special powers differently. For example, the Kashmiri tantrics explain the powers as anima (awareness than one is present in everything), laghima (lightness, be free from presumed diversity or differences), mahima (heaviness, realize one's limit is beyond one's own consciousness), prapti (attain, be restful and at peace with one's own nature), prakamya (forebearance, grasp and accept cosmic diversity), vasita (control, realize that one always has power to do whatever one wants), isitva (self lordship, a yogi is always free). More broadly, the tantric sub-traditions sought nondual knowledge and enlightening liberation by abandoning all rituals, and with the help of reasoning (yuktih), scriptures (sastras) and the initiating Guru.

Kashmir Shaivism

Kashmir Shaivism is an influential tradition within Shaivism that emerged in Kashmir in the 1st millennium CE and thrived in early centuries of the 2nd millennium before the region was overwhelmed by the Islamic invasions from the Hindu Kush region. The Kashmir Shaivism traditions became nearly extinct due to Islam except for their preservation by Kashmiri Pandits.

Kashmir Shaivism has been a nondualistic school, and is distinct from the dualistic Shaiva Siddhānta tradition that also existed in medieval Kashmir. A notable philosophy of monistic Kashmiri Shaivism has been the Pratyabhijna ideas, particularly those by the 10th century scholar Utpaladeva and 11th century Abhinavagupta and Kshemaraja.Wallis, Christopher; Tantra Illuminated, Chapter 2, Kashmir Shaivism Their extensive texts established the Shaiva theology and philosophy in an advaita (monism) framework.Flood, Gavin. D. 1996. An Introduction to Hinduism. P.164-167 The Siva Sutras of 9th century Vasugupta and his ideas about Spanda have also been influential to this and other Shaiva sub-traditions, but it is probable that much older Shaiva texts once existed.

A notable feature of Kashmir Shaivism was its openness and integration of ideas from Shaktism, Vaishnavism and Vajrayana Buddhism. For example, one sub-tradition of Kashmir Shaivism adopts Goddess worship (Shaktism) by stating that the approach to god Shiva is through goddess Shakti. This tradition combined monistic ideas with tantric practices. Another idea of this school was Trika, or modal triads of Shakti and cosmology as developed by Somananda in the early 10th century.Kashmiri Shaiva Philosophy , David Peter Lawrence, University of Manitoba, IEP (2010)

Nath

 
Nath: a Shaiva subtradition that emerged from a much older Siddha tradition based on Yoga. The Nath consider Shiva as "Adinatha" or the first guru, and it has been a small but notable and influential movement in India whose devotees were called "Yogi" or "Jogi", given their monastic unconventional ways and emphasis on Yoga.

Nath theology integrated philosophy from Advaita Vedanta and Buddhism traditions. Their unconventional ways challenged all orthodox premises, exploring dark and shunned practices of society as a means to understanding theology and gaining inner powers. The tradition traces itself to 9th or 10th century Matsyendranath and to ideas and organization developed by Gorakshanath. They combined both theistic practices such as worshipping goddesses and their historic Gurus in temples, as well monistic goals of achieving liberation or jivan-mukti while alive, by reaching the perfect (siddha) state of realizing oneness of self and everything with Shiva.

They formed monastic organisations, and some of them metamorphosed into warrior ascetics to resist persecution during the Islamic rule of the Indian subcontinent.

Lingayatism

Lingayatism, also known as Veera Shaivism: is a distinct Shaivite religious tradition in India. It was founded by the 12th-century philosopher and statesman Basava and spread by his followers, called Sharanas.

Lingayatism emphasizes qualified monism and bhakti (loving devotion) to Shiva, with philosophical foundations similar to those of the 11th–12th-century South Indian philosopher Ramanuja. Its worship is notable for the iconographic form of Ishtalinga, which the adherents wear.Jan Peter Schouten (1995), Revolution of the Mystics: On the Social Aspects of Vīraśaivism, Motilal Banarsidass, pages 2–3 Large communities of Lingayats are found in the south Indian state of Karnataka and nearby regions.; Quote: "The Lingayats are a Hindu sect concentrated in the state of Karnataka (a southern provincial state of India), which covers 191,773 square kilometers. The Lingayats constitute around 20 percent of the total population in that state." Lingayatism has its own theological literature with sophisticated theoretical sub-traditions.

They were influential in the Hindu Vijayanagara Empire that reversed the territorial gains of Muslim rulers, after the invasions of the Deccan region first by Delhi Sultanate and later other Sultanates. Lingayats consider their scripture to be Basava Purana, which was completed in 1369 during the reign of Vijayanagara ruler Bukka Raya I. Lingayat (Veerashaiva) thinkers rejected the custodial hold of Brahmins over the Vedas and the shastras, but they did not outright reject the Vedic knowledge. The 13th-century Telugu Virashaiva poet Palkuriki Somanatha, the author of the scripture of Lingayatism, for example asserted, "Virashaivism fully conformed to the Vedas and the shastras."

Demography

There are no census data available on demographic history or trends for the traditions within Hinduism. Large Shaivite communities exist in the Southern Indian states of Tamil Nadu, Karnataka, Telangana, Kerala and Andhra Pradesh as well as in Jammu & Kashmir, Himachal Pradesh and Uttrakhand. Substantial communities are also found in Haryana, Maharashtra and central Uttar Pradesh.

According to Galvin Flood, Shaivism and Shaktism traditions are difficult to separate, as many Shaiva Hindus revere the goddess Shakti regularly. The denominations of Hinduism, states Julius Lipner, are unlike those found in major religions of the world, because Hindu denominations are fuzzy with individuals revering gods and goddesses polycentrically, with many Shaiva and Vaishnava adherents recognizing Sri (Lakshmi), Parvati, Saraswati and other aspects of the goddess Devi. Similarly, Shakta Hindus revere Shiva and goddesses such as Parvati, Durga, Radha, Sita and Saraswati important in Shaiva and Vaishnava traditions.

Influence
Shiva is a pan-Hindu god and Shaivism ideas on Yoga and as the god of performance arts (Nataraja) have been influential on all traditions of Hinduism.

Shaivism was highly influential in southeast Asia from the late 6th century onwards, particularly the Khmer and Cham kingdoms of Indo-China, and across the major islands of Indonesia such as Sumatra, Java and Bali. This influence on classical Cambodia, Vietnam and Thailand continued when Mahayana Buddhism arrived with the same Indians.

In Shaivism of Indonesia, the popular name for Shiva has been Bhattara Guru, which is derived from Sanskrit Bhattaraka which means "noble lord". He is conceptualized as a kind spiritual teacher, the first of all Gurus in Indonesian Hindu texts, mirroring the Dakshinamurti aspect of Shiva in the Indian subcontinent. However, the Bhattara Guru has more aspects than the Indian Shiva, as the Indonesian Hindus blended their spirits and heroes with him. Bhattara Guru's wife in southeast Asia is the same Hindu deity Durga, who has been popular since ancient times, and she too has a complex character with benevolent and fierce manifestations, each visualized with different names such as Uma, Sri, Kali and others.R. Ghose (1966), Saivism in Indonesia during the Hindu-Javanese period, The University of Hong Kong Press, pages 15–17 Shiva has been called Sadasiva, Paramasiva, Mahadeva in benevolent forms, and Kala, Bhairava, Mahakala in his fierce forms. The Indonesian Hindu texts present the same philosophical diversity of Shaivism traditions found on the subcontinent. However, among the texts that have survived into the contemporary era, the more common are of those of Shaiva Siddhanta (locally also called Siwa Siddhanta, Sridanta).

As Bhakti movement ideas spread in South India, Shaivite devotionalism became a potent movement in Karnataka and Tamil Nadu. Shaivism was adopted by several ruling Hindu dynasties as the state religion (though other Hindu traditions, Buddhism and Jainism continued in parallel), including the Chola and the Rajputs. A similar trend was witnessed in early medieval Indonesia with the Majapahit empire and pre-Islamic Malaya.For more on the subject of Shaivite influence on Indonesia, one could read N.J.Krom, Inleiding tot de Hindoe-Javaansche Kunst/Introduction to Hindu-Javanese Art, The Hague, Martinus Nijhof, 1923 In the Himalayan Hindu kingdom of Nepal, Shaivism remained a popular form of Hinduism and co-evolved with Mahayana and Vajrayana Buddhism.

Shaktism
The goddess tradition of Hinduism called Shaktism is closely related to Shaivism. In many regions of India, not only did the ideas of Shaivism influence the evolution of Shaktism, Shaivism itself got influenced by it and progressively subsumed the reverence for the divine feminine (Devi) as an equal and essential partner of divine masculine (Shiva). The goddess Shakti in eastern states of India is considered the inseparable partner of god Shiva. According to Galvin Flood, the closeness between Shaivism and Shaktism traditions is such that these traditions of Hinduism are at times difficult to separate. Some Shaiva worship in Shiva and Shakti temples.

Smarta Tradition
Shiva is a part of the Smarta Tradition, sometimes referred to as Smartism, another tradition of Hinduism. The Smarta Hindus are associated with the Advaita Vedanta theology, and their practices include an interim step that incorporates simultaneous reverence for five deities, which includes Shiva along with Vishnu, Surya, Devi and Ganesha. This is called the Panchayatana puja. The Smartas thus accept the primary deity of Shaivism as a means to their spiritual goals.

Philosophically, the Smarta tradition emphasizes that all idols (murti) are icons of saguna Brahman, a means to realizing the abstract Ultimate Reality called nirguna Brahman. The five or six icons are seen by Smartas as multiple representations of the one Saguna Brahman (i.e., a personal God with form), rather than as distinct beings. The ultimate goal in this practice is to transition past the use of icons, then follow a philosophical and meditative path to understanding the oneness of Atman (Self) and Brahman (metaphysical Ultimate Reality) – as "That art Thou".The Four Denominations of Hinduism , Basics of Hinduism, Kauai Hindu Monastery

Panchayatana puja that incorporates Shiva became popular in medieval India and is attributed to 8th century Adi Shankara, but archaeological evidence suggests that this practice long predates the birth of Adi Shankara. Many Panchayatana mandalas and temples have been uncovered that are from the Gupta Empire period, and one Panchayatana set from the village of Nand (about 24 kilometers from Ajmer) has been dated to belong to the Kushan Empire era (pre-300 CE). According to James Harle, major Hindu temples from 1st millennium CE commonly embedded the pancayatana architecture, from Odisha to Karnataka to Kashmir. Large temples often present multiple deities in the same temple complex, while some explicitly include fusion deities such as Harihara (half Shiva, half Vishnu).

Vaishnavism

Vaishnava texts reverentially mention Shiva. For example, the Vishnu Purana primarily focuses on the theology of Hindu god Vishnu and his avatars such as Krishna, but it praises Brahma and Shiva and asserts that they are one with Vishnu. The Vishnu Sahasranama in the Mahabharata list a thousand attributes and epithets of Vishnu. The list identifies Shiva with Vishnu.

Reverential inclusion of Shaiva ideas and iconography are very common in major Vaishnava temples, such as Dakshinamurti symbolism of Shaiva thought is often enshrined on the southern wall of the main temple of major Vaishnava temples in peninsular India. Harihara temples in and outside the Indian subcontinent have historically combined Shiva and Vishnu, such as at the Lingaraj Mahaprabhu temple in Bhubaneshwar, Odisha. According to Julius Lipner, Vaishnavism traditions such as Sri Vaishnavism embrace Shiva, Ganesha and others, not as distinct deities of polytheism, but as polymorphic manifestation of the same supreme divine principle, providing the devotee a polycentric access to the spiritual.

Similarly, Shaiva traditions have reverentially embraced other gods and goddesses as manifestation of the same divine. The Skanda Purana, for example in section 6.254.100 states, "He who is Shiva is Vishnu, he who is Vishnu is Sadashiva".

Sauraism (Sun deity)
The sun god called Surya is an ancient deity of Hinduism, and several ancient Hindu kingdoms particularly in the northwest and eastern regions of the Indian subcontinent revered Surya. These devotees called Sauras once had a large corpus of theological texts, and Shaivism literature reverentially acknowledges these. For example, the Shaiva text Srikanthiyasamhita mentions 85 Saura texts, almost all of which are believed to have been lost during the Islamic invasion and rule period, except for large excerpts found embedded in Shaiva manuscripts discovered in the Himalayan mountains. Shaivism incorporated Saura ideas, and the surviving Saura manuscripts such as Saurasamhita acknowledge the influence of Shaivism, according to Alexis Sanderson, assigning "itself to the canon of Shaiva text Vathula-Kalottara.

Yoga movements

Yoga and meditation has been an integral part of Shaivism, and it has been a major innovator of techniques such as those of Hatha Yoga.Alexis Sanderson (1999), YOGA IN ŚAIVISM , Oxford University, pages 1-7 Many major Shiva temples and Shaiva tritha (pilgrimage) centers depict anthropomorphic iconography of Shiva as a giant statue wherein Shiva is a lone yogi meditating, as do Shaiva texts.

In several Shaiva traditions such as the Kashmir Shaivism, anyone who seeks personal understanding and spiritual growth has been called a Yogi. The Shiva Sutras (aphorisms) of Shaivism teach yoga in many forms. According to Mark Dyczkowski, yoga – which literally means "union" – to this tradition has meant the "realisation of our true inherent nature which is inherently greater than our thoughts can ever conceive", and that the goal of yoga is to be the "free, eternal, blissful, perfect, infinite spiritually conscious" one is.

Many Yoga-emphasizing Shaiva traditions emerged in medieval India, who refined yoga methods such as by introducing Hatha Yoga techniques. One such movement had been the Nath Yogis, a Shaivism sub-tradition that integrated philosophy from Advaita Vedanta and Buddhism traditions. It was founded by Matsyendranath and further developed by Gorakshanath. The texts of these Yoga emphasizing Hindu traditions present their ideas in Shaiva context.

Hindu performance arts
Shiva is the lord of dance and dramatic arts in Hinduism. This is celebrated in Shaiva temples as Nataraja, which typically shows Shiva dancing in one of the poses in the ancient Hindu text on performance arts called the Natya Shastra.

Dancing Shiva as a metaphor for celebrating life and arts is very common in ancient and medieval Hindu temples. For example, it is found in Badami cave temples, Ellora Caves, Khajuraho, Chidambaram and others. The Shaiva link to the performance arts is celebrated in Indian classical dances such as Bharatanatyam and Chhau.

Buddhism
Buddhism and Shaivism have interacted and influenced each other since ancient times, in both South Asia and Southeast Asia. Their Siddhas and esoteric traditions, in particular, have overlapped to an extent where Buddhists and Hindus would worship in the same temple such as in the Seto Machindranath. In southeast Asia, the two traditions were not presented in competitive or polemical terms, rather as two alternate paths that lead to the same goals of liberation, with theologians disagreeing which of these is faster and simpler. Scholars disagree whether a syncretic tradition emerged from Buddhism and Shaivism, or it was a coalition with free borrowing of ideas, but they agree that the two traditions co-existed peacefully.

The earliest evidence of a close relationship between Shaivism and Buddhism comes from the archaeological sites and damaged sculptures from the northwest Indian subcontinent, such as Gandhara. These are dated to about the 1st-century CE, with Shiva depicted in Buddhist arts. The Buddhist Avalokiteshvara is linked to Shiva in many of these arts, but in others Shiva is linked to Bodhisattva Maitreya with he shown as carrying his own water pot like Vedic priests. According to Richard Blurton, the ancient works show that the Bodhisattva of Compassion in Buddhism has many features in common with Shiva in Shaivism. The Shaiva Hindu and Buddhist syncretism continues in the contemporary era in the island of Bali, Indonesia. In Central Asian Buddhism, and its historic arts, syncretism and a shared expression of Shaivism, Buddhism and Tantra themes has been common.

The syncretism between Buddhism and Shaivism was particularly marked in southeast Asia, but this was not unique, rather it was a common phenomenon also observed in the eastern regions of the Indian subcontinent, the south and the Himalayan regions. This tradition continues in predominantly Hindu Bali Indonesia in the modern era, where Buddha is considered the younger brother of Shiva. In the pre-Islamic Java, Shaivism and Buddhism were considered very close and allied religions, though not identical religions. This idea is also found in the sculptures and temples in the eastern states of India and the Himalayan region. For example, Hindu temples in these regions show Harihara (half Shiva, half Vishnu) flanked by a standing Buddha on its right and a standing Surya (Hindu Sun god) on left.Rk Sahu (2011), Iconography of Surya in the Temple Art of Odisha , Orissa Review, Volume 11, page 31

On major festivals of Bali Hindus, such as the Nyepi – a "festival of silence", the observations are officiated by both Buddhist and Shaiva priests.

Jainism
Jainism co-existed with Shaiva culture since ancient times, particularly in western and southern India where it received royal support from Hindu kings of Chaulukya, Ganga and Rashtrakuta dynasties. In late 1st millennium CE, Jainism too developed a Shaiva-like tantric ritual culture with Mantra-goddesses. These Jain rituals were aimed at mundane benefits using japas (mantra recitation) and making offerings into Homa fire.

According to Alexis Sanderson, the link and development of Shaiva goddesses into Jaina goddess is more transparent than a similar connection between Shaivism and Buddhism. The 11th-century Jain text ‘’Bhairavapadmavatikalpa’’, for example, equates Padmavati of Jainism with Tripura-bhairavi of Shaivism and Shaktism. Among the major goddesses of Jainism that are rooted in Hindu pantheon, particularly Shaiva, include Lakshmi and Vagishvari (Sarasvati) of the higher world in Jain cosmology, Vidyadevis of the middle world, and Yakshis such as Ambika, Cakreshvari, Padmavati and Jvalamalini of the lower world according to Jainism.

Shaiva-Shakti iconography is found in major Jain temples. For example, the Osian temple of Jainism near Jodhpur features Chamunda, Durga, Sitala, and a naked Bhairava. While Shaiva and Jain practices had considerable overlap, the interaction between the Jain community and Shaiva community differed on the acceptance of ritual animal sacrifices before goddesses. Jain remained strictly vegetarian and avoided animal sacrifice, while Shaiva accepted the practice.

Temples and pilgrimage

Shaiva Puranas, Agamas and other regional literature refer to temples by various terms such as Mandir, Shivayatana, Shivalaya, Shambhunatha, Jyotirlingam, Shristhala, Chattraka, Bhavaggana, Bhuvaneshvara, Goputika, Harayatana, Kailasha, Mahadevagriha, Saudhala and others. In Southeast Asia Shaiva temples are called Candi (Java), Pura (Bali), and Wat (Cambodia and nearby regions).

Many of the Shiva-related pilgrimage sites such as Varanasi, Amarnath, Kedarnath, Somnath, and others are broadly considered holy in Hinduism. They are called kṣétra (Sanskrit: क्षेत्र). A kṣétra has many temples, including one or more major ones. These temples and its location attracts pilgrimage called tirtha (or tirthayatra).

Many of the historic Puranas literature embed tourism guide to Shaivism-related pilgrimage centers and temples. For example, the Skanda Purana deals primarily with Tirtha Mahatmyas (pilgrimage travel guides) to numerous geographical points, but also includes a chapter stating that a temple and tirtha is ultimately a state of mind and virtuous everyday life.

Major rivers of the Indian subcontinent and their confluence (sangam), natural springs, origin of Ganges River (and pancha-ganga), along with high mountains such as Kailasha with Mansovar Lake are particularly revered spots in Shaivism. Twelve jyotirlinga sites across India have been particularly important pilgrimage sites in Shaivism representing the radiant light (jyoti) of infiniteness,Harding 1998, pp. 158-158 as per Śiva Mahāpurāṇa. They are Somnatha, Mallikarjuna, Mahakaleshwar, Omkareshwar, Kedarnatha, Bhimashankar, Visheshvara, Trayambakesvara, Vaidyanatha, Nageshvara, Rameshvara and Grishneshwar. Other texts mention five Kedras (Kedarnatha, Tunganatha, Rudranatha, Madhyamesvara and Kalpeshvara), five Badri (Badrinatha, Pandukeshvara, Sujnanien, Anni matha and Urghava), snow lingam of Amarnatha, flame of Jwalamukhi, all of the Narmada River, and others. Kashi (Varanasi) is declared as particularly special in numerous Shaiva texts and Upanishads, as well as in the pan-Hindu Sannyasa Upanishads such as the Jabala Upanishad''.

The early Bhakti movement poets of Shaivism composed poems about pilgrimage and temples, using these sites as metaphors for internal spiritual journey.

See also 
 Chaturdasa Devata
 Hindu denominations
 History of Shaivism
 Jangam Lingayat
 Shaiva Siddhanta
 Kashmiri Shaivism

Notes

References

Sources

  (fourth revised & enlarged edition).

 
  Third AES reprint edition, 1995.
  Four volumes.
 .
 .
 
 

 
  
 

 
 
 
 
 

 
 

 
 
 
 
 
 
 
 
 
 
 
 
 
 
 
 
 
 
 
 
 
 
 
 
 
 
 
 
 
 
 
 
 
  Second edition.
 
 
 * 
  Second revised reprint edition. Two volumes. First published 1927 by the University of Calcutta.

B. S. L. Hanumantha Rao, Religion in Andhra: A Survey of Religious Developments in Andhra from Early Times Upto A.D. 1325. Department of Archaeology and Museums, Government of A.P., 1993

External links

Encyclopædia Britannica, "Shaivism"
Saivism.Net
Alexis sanderson, Publications, scholarly studies in Shaivism

 
 

 
Theistic Indian philosophy
Hindu denominations
Monotheistic religions